Techno Cop is a 1988 action video game for the Amiga, Amstrad CPC, Apple II, Atari ST, Commodore 64, DOS and ZX Spectrum. It was subsequently ported to the Sega Genesis in 1990. The gameplay combines pseudo-3D driving in the graphical style of Out Run with side-scrolling action as the player controls a police officer driving to and then moving through various seedy locations in a one-man war against crime. The game was the first game on the Genesis to have a warning label due to its violent content.

An NES version was developed by Probe Software and supposed to be released in 1992 by Tengen, but was cancelled as Tengen scrapped the idea for the game, due to legal troubles Tengen was dealing with from Nintendo. Only a few sprite-sheets and music by Jeroen Tel exist from the project.

The game was largely panned by video game critics for its simplistic graphics, sound, and the fact that many of the levels looked too similar. A Sega Genesis sequel, Techno Cop: The Final Mission, was planned but never released.

Storyline
In the single-player side-scrolling game the player is a cop in a seedy futuristic urban city. Armed with a pistol, the player has to kill various thugs, before the timer runs out. While the game has several levels, the background in the game does not change often.

The other half of the game is a driving sequence, similar to other computer games such as RoadBlasters.

Techno Cop was one of the first games made for the Mega Drive/Genesis from a third party developer and was part of an attempt by Razorsoft to test what sort of content would Sega allow on a game made for one of its systems.

Violent content

Both Nintendo of America and Sega of America insisted upon previewing games made for their system, prior to release, to check for bugs and potentially controversial or offensive content.  Sega allowed Techno Cop to be released without requiring Razor Soft to remove or tone down the game's violent content.  Along with the blood, when the playable character shot at another character, they would be blown apart.

Reception
Computer Gaming World gave the game a positive review, saying "despite occasional boredom in the driving segment, the game is extremely absorbing."

References

External links

Play Techno Cop online on Game-Oldies.

1988 video games
Sega Genesis games
ZX Spectrum games
Amstrad CPC games
Commodore 64 games
Atari ST games
Amiga games
Apple II games
DOS games
U.S. Gold games
Video games about police officers
Video games scored by Jeroen Tel
Video games developed in Canada